Lithium naphthalene is an organic salt with the chemical formula Li+. In the research laboratory, it is used as a reductant in the synthesis of organic, organometallic, and inorganic chemistry. It is usually generated in situ. Lithium naphthalene crystallizes with ligands bound to Li+.

Preparation and properties
The compound is prepared by stirring the metallic lithium with naphthalene in an ethereal solvent, usually as tetrahydrofuran or dimethoxyethane. The resulting salt is dark green. The reaction of naphthalene with lithium can be accelerated by sonication.  Methods for assaying lithium naphthalene have been developed as well.  The anion is a radical, giving a strong EPR signal near g = 2.0. Its deep green color arises from absorptions at 463, 735 nm.  

Several solvates of lithium naphthalene have been characterized by X-ray crystallography. The effects are subtle, the outer pair of HC–CH bonds contract by 3 pm and the other nine C–C bonds elongate by 2–3 pm.  Net: reduction weakens the bonding.

Reactions

Redox
With a reduction potential near −2.5 V versus the normal hydrogen electrode, the naphthalene radical anion is a strong reducing agent.

Protonation
The anion is strongly basic, and a typical degradation pathway involves reaction with water and related protic sources such as alcohols.  These reactions afford dihydronaphthalene:
2 LiC10H8  +  2H2O  →  C10H10  +  C10H8  +  2LiOH

As a ligand precursor
Alkali metal salts of the naphthalene radical anion are used to prepare complexes of naphthalene.

Related compounds
Many related radical anions are known such as those derived from anthracene, with other alkali metals (especially sodium), and with diverse ligands attached to the alkali metal cations. Dilithium naphthalene is also known in the form [Li(tmeda)2]2C10H8.

References

Free radicals
Lithium salts
One-electron reducing agents
Organolithium compounds
Naphthalenes